Daniel Lozakovich (born 1 April 2001) is a Swedish violinist. He was born in Stockholm to a Belarusian father and Kyrgyz mother, and he made his concert debut aged 9 under Vladimir Spivakov in Moscow.

Career 
Lozakovich began playing the violin at the age of six, later enrolling at Karlsruhe University of Music to study with Professor Josef Rissin in 2012, and since 2015 has been mentored by Eduard Wulfson in Geneva. In 2016, he was the winner of the Vladimir Spivakov International Violin Competition and, soon after, was a returning soloist with the Mariinsky Orchestra under Valery Gergiev in the closing concert of the XV Moscow Easter Festival. He signed an exclusive contract with Deutsche Grammophon in June 2016, soon after his 15th birthday, which made him the youngest member of the label’s roster.

Lozakovich’s first full recording for Deutsche Grammophon, made with the Kammerorchester des Symphonieorchesters des Bayerischen Rundfunks, was released in June 2018 and featured Bach’s two concertos for violin and orchestra (BWV 1041 and 1042), and his Partita No.2 in D minor BWV 1004 for solo violin. His debut album was a great success, reaching No.1 in the French Amazon charts (all music categories), and No.1 in Germany’s classical album chart. 

None but the Lonely Heart, Lozakovich’s second album, was released in October 2019. Dedicated to the music of Tchaikovsky, it includes the Violin Concerto, recorded live with the National Philharmonic Orchestra of Russia and Spivakov (“a committed, restrained and profound reading, of peerless musicality”, classiquenews.com), the Méditation for violin and orchestra and arrangements of two vocal works, Lensky’s Aria from Eugene Onegin and the song from which the album takes its name: the Romance, Op.6 No.6, “None but the lonely heart”.

On one album, Daniel joined forces with his mentor Gergiev and the Münchner Philharmoniker to celebrate the 250th anniversary of Beethoven’s birth with a live recording of the composer’s Violin Concerto, a work he considers “the greatest concerto ever written.”

Lozakovich currently plays both the Ex-Baron Rothschild Stradivari on generous loan on behalf of the owner by Reuning & Son (Boston) and Eduard Wulfson, and the Le Reynier Stradivari (1727), which was kindly loaned by the LVMH group.

Daniel Lozakovich’s music-making was said to leave critics and audiences spellbound. Classicagenda characterized him as "Prince of the violin".  “Perfect mastery. An exceptional talent,” observed Le Figaro after a performance in Verbier Festival, while the Boston Globe praised the “poise, tonal purity, and technique to spare” of his debut with the Boston Symphony Orchestra and Andris Nelsons at the Tanglewood Festival in July 2017.

Discography 

 Johann Sebastian Bach: Violin Concertos Nos. 1 & 2, Partita No. 2 (2018). Kammerorchester des Symphonieorchesters des Bayerischen Rundfunks. DG
 Tchaikovsky: None but the Lonely Heart (2019). National Philharmonic of Russia, Vladimir Spivakov. DG
Beethoven: Violin Concerto (2020). Münchner Philharmoniker, Valery Gergiev. DG [live recording, Beethoven 250th anniversary]

References

External links

2001 births
Living people
Swedish classical violinists
Deutsche Grammophon artists
21st-century classical violinists
Musicians from Stockholm
Swedish people of Belarusian descent
21st-century Swedish musicians